James W. Valentine (born 11 November 1926) is an American evolutionary biologist, Professor Emeritus in the Department of Integrative Biology at the University of California, Berkeley, and curator at the University of California Museum of Paleontology.

He was born in Los Angeles, California and educated at Phillips University, (B.A., 1951) and
the University of California, Los Angeles (M.A., 1954, Ph.D., 1958). He married Diane Mondragon in 1987
and had 3 children.

Books
Valentine has published widely, and in addition to peer-reviewed publications has written several books:

Evolutionary Paleoecology of the Marine Biosphere 1973 
Evolution 1977 with Theodosius Dobzhansky, G. Ledyard Stebbins and Ayala
Evolving : The Theory And Processes Of Organic Evolution 1979 , with Francisco J. Ayala
Phanerozoic Diversity Patterns : Profiles In Macroevolution 1985 , editor
On the Origin of Phyla 2004 
The Cambrian Explosion: The Construction of Animal Biodiversity, 2013 , with Douglas Erwin

References

External links
Homepage

1926 births
Evolutionary biologists
Living people
University of California, Berkeley faculty
University of Missouri faculty
Members of the United States National Academy of Sciences